Dzveli Khibula is a village located in Khobi Municipality, Samegrelo-Zemo Svaneti, in western Georgia. The village is known as where the first president of Georgia Zviad Gamsakhurdia (1939-1993), spent the last days of his life.

References

Populated places in Samegrelo-Zemo Svaneti